General elections were held in Malta between 16 and 20 August 1849, the first in the country's history.

Background
In 1835, Malta was granted a Government Council by the British authorities. It consisted of the Governor, four officials and three members appointed by the governor. In June 1849 Governor Richard More O'Ferrall passed a new constitution that increased the Council to 18 members, of which ten would be appointed and eight elected.

Results
A total of 3,767 people were registered to vote, of which 3,315 cast votes, giving a turnout of 88%.

References

1849
1849 elections in Europe
1849 in Malta
August 1849 events